{{DISPLAYTITLE:Mu2 Octantis}}

 

Mu2 Octantis (μ2 Oct) is a binary star system of two G-type main-sequence stars. It shares the designation μ with μ1 Octantis, from which it is separated by 50 arcminutes.

Mu2 Octantis has a 29% higher mass than the sun, and is slightly hotter.  Its radius is 73% more than the Sun's and it is nearly four times as luminous.

This star is a member of a wider binary star system. The semimajor axis of the stars' orbit is 932 AU. The companion star is HD 196068, another G-type main-sequence star with an apparent magnitude of 7.18.

Planetary system
From 1998 to 2012, the system was observed using the CORALIE instrument, at the ESO's La Silla Observatory.

In November 2012, a long-period, wide-orbiting planet was deduced by radial velocity around HD 196067. The planet has been pulled to an eccentric orbit by the B star HD 196068.

References

Planetary systems with one confirmed planet
Binary stars
Octans
Durchmusterung objects
7864
196067
102125
Octantis, Mu
G-type main-sequence stars
J20414409-7521029